Argyle was a railway station on the Crookwell railway line, New South Wales, Australia. The station opened in 1902 with the opening of the line, and consisted of a 50 ft platform on the down side of the line. It gained its name from Argyle in Scotland, and was located adjacent to the Goulburn Training Centre.

In 1942 a loop siding was constructed, by 1969 both this and the platform had been demolished. North of the station lies the bridge over the Wollondilly River.

References

Disused regional railway stations in New South Wales
Railway stations in Australia opened in 1902
Railway stations closed in 1969